Acacia chippendalei, commonly known as Chippendale's wattle, is a shrub belonging to the genus Acacia and the subgenus Lycopodiifoliae endemic to northern Australia.

Description
It blooms from September to October and produces yellow flowers.

Taxonomy
The species was first formally described by the botanist Leslie Pedley in 1972 as part of the work A revision of Acacia lycopodiifolia A. Cunn. ex Hook. and its Allies as published in the Contributions from the Queensland Herbarium. It was reclassified as Racosperma chippendalei by Pedley in 1987 then transferred back to genus Acacia in 2001.

Distribution
It is native to an area in Queensland, the Northern Territory and the Kimberley and Goldfields regions of Western Australia. It is found from the Sir Frederick Range in Western Australia in the west through central parts of the Northern Territory to around Cloncurry to Mount Isa where it grows in skeletal rocky lateritic and deep sandy soils.

See also
List of Acacia species

References

chippendalei
Acacias of Western Australia
Plants described in 1972
Taxa named by Leslie Pedley
Flora of the Northern Territory
Flora of Queensland